Ponso is a comune (municipality) in the Province of Padua in the Italian region Veneto, located about  southwest of Venice and about  southwest of Padua.

The municipality of Ponso contains the frazioni (subdivisions, mainly villages and hamlets) Bresega and Chiesazza.

Ponso borders the following municipalities: Carceri, Ospedaletto Euganeo, Piacenza d'Adige, Santa Margherita d'Adige, Vighizzolo d'Este.

Among its buildings is the 17th-century Villa Francanzani.

Demographic evolution

References

External links
 www.comune.ponso.pd.it/

Cities and towns in Veneto